Elma Penelope Meagher (1935 – 5 Jun 1995), better known as Penny Meagher, was an Australian painter.

Penny Meagher was born in Sydney, and started drawing from an early age. She was educated at Ascham School, Edgecliff and Frensham School, Mittagong. She studied economics at the University of Sydney. In 1952, she went on a trip to London, where she enrolled at the Chelsea School of Art. From 1960 to 1962, she studied at the East Sydney Technical College, and later did a graduate course in painting at the University of New South Wales.

In the late 1960s, Penny Meagher became a director of the Macquarie Galleries in Sydney. Her work has been exhibited only rarely and at occasional group exhibitions, this included the important STILL LIFES at David Jones Gallery in 1984.

References 

1935 births
1995 deaths
20th-century Australian women artists
20th-century Australian artists
University of New South Wales alumni
Australian women painters
Artists from Sydney
People educated at Ascham School
People educated at Frensham School